The women's doubles tournament of the 2013 BWF World Championships (World Badminton Championships) was held from August 5 to 11.  Wang Xiaoli and Yu Yang were the defending champions.

Wang Xiaoli and Yu Yang defeated Eom Hye-won and Jang Ye-na 21–14, 18–21, 21–8 in the final.

Seeds

  Wang Xiaoli / Yu Yang (champion)
  Ma Jin / Tang Jinhua (quarterfinals)
  Misaki Matsutomo / Ayaka Takahashi (second round)
  Christinna Pedersen / Kamilla Rytter Juhl (semifinals)
  Tian Qing / Zhao Yunlei (semifinals)
  Miyuki Maeda / Satoko Suetsuna (third round)
  Bao Yixin / Zhong Qianxin (quarterfinals)
  Eom Hye-won / Jang Ye-na (final)

  Pia Zebadiah Bernadeth / Rizki Amelia Pradipta (quarterfinals)
  Duanganong Aroonkesorn / Kunchala Voravichitchaikul (third round)
  Jung Kyung-eun / Kim Ha-na (quarterfinals)
  Poon Lok Yan / Tse Ying Suet (third round)
  Lee So-hee / Shin Seung-chan (third round)
  Vivian Hoo Kah Mun / Woon Khe Wei (third round)
  Gebby Ristiyani Imawan / Tiara Rosalia Nuraidah (second round)
  Ko A-ra / Yoo Hae-won (third round)

Draw

Finals

Section 1

Section 2

Section 3

Section 4

References
tournamentsoftware.com

2013 BWF World Championships
BWF